Busur is a village situated in Petrovac na Mlavi municipality, Braničevo District in Serbia.

References

Populated places in Braničevo District